Vinoo Balakrishnan (born 6 January 1989) is a Botswana cricketer. In May 2019, he was named in Botswana's squad for the Regional Finals of the 2018–19 ICC T20 World Cup Africa Qualifier tournament in Uganda. He made his Twenty20 International (T20I) debut for Botswana against Uganda on 20 May 2019. He was the leading run-scorer for Botswana in the Regional Finals, with 63 runs in three matches.

In October 2021, he was named in Botswana's squad for their matches in Group B of the 2021 ICC Men's T20 World Cup Africa Qualifier tournament in Rwanda.

References

External links
 

1989 births
Living people
Botswana cricketers
Botswana Twenty20 International cricketers
Place of birth missing (living people)